Sir Richard Lavenham Gardner, FRSB, FRS (born 10 June 1943) is a British embryologist and geneticist. He is currently an Emeritus Professor at the University of York, and was previously a Royal Society Research Professor. 

Since 1982, he has been Chair of the Royal Society Working Group on human embryo research, stem cells and cloning. He was the President of the Institute of Biology from 2006 to 2008, President of the Institute of Animal Biotechnology from 1986 to 2006 and is currently Chair of Trustees of the Animals in Science – Education Trust.

Early life and education
Gardner was born in Dorking, Surrey. His father, a professional artist specialising in stained glass, was killed a few weeks later during the landings on Sicily. Gardner was educated at St John's School, Leatherhead and later studied Natural Sciences at St Catharine's College, Cambridge before doing a PhD in the University's Physiology Department with Nobel Laureate, Robert Edwards. In 1973 he was appointed to a University Lectureship at Oxford where, from 1978 until his retirement in 2008, he held a Royal Society Research Professorship.

Scientific career
Gardner pioneered the transplantation of cells and tissues between blastocyst stage mouse embryos and their reconstruction from their component tissues. He was the first to apply clonal analysis to study cell fate and potency in mammals, and used this strategy to provide conclusive evidence against early segregation of the mammalian germline. Blastocyst injection was later adopted almost universally for assessing the developmental potential of embryonic stem (ES) cells and their competence to colonise the germline following genetic modification. With Robert Edwards, he also established proof of principle for preimplantation genetic diagnosis. 

His main research interests include investigating the fate and deployment of cells in early mammalian development with particular emphasis on clonal analysis, establishing the origin and efficient derivation of stem cells from early embryos, and determining the extent to which pre-patterning normally directs early development in mammals.

For many years, Gardner chaired the Royal Society's ad hoc committee on 'human embryo research', and later its working group on 'stem cells and cloning' and in this role he often advised on the scientific and ethical implications of cloning, attempting to clarify the complexities of the topic for a public audience. 

He served as President of the Institute of Animal Technology from 1986 to 2006 and the Institute of Biology (now the Royal Society of Biology) from 2006 to 2008. He is a trustee of the Edwards and Steptoe Research Trust and chair of the Animals in Science Education Trust.

He gave the Cumberland Lodge Annual Lecture in 2010, and the British Fertility Society's Patrick Steptoe Memorial Lecture in 2015.

Selected publications

Gardner, R.L. and Lyon, M.F. (1971).  X-chromosome inactivation studied by injection of a single cell into the mouse blastocyst.  Nature 231, 385-386.
Gardner, R.L., Lyon, M.F., Evans, E.P. and Burtenshaw, M.D. (1985).  Clonal analysis of X-chromosome inactivation and the origin of the germ line in the mouse embryo.  J. Embryol. exp. Morph., 88, 349–363.
Gardner, R.L. and Edwards, R.G. (1968).  Control of the sex ratio at full term in the rabbit by transferring sexed blastocysts.  Nature 218, 346–348.
Gardner, R.L. (1985).  Clonal analysis of early mammalian development.  Phil. Trans. R. Soc, B; 312, 163–178.
Gardner, R.L. and Cockroft, D.L. (1998).  Complete dissipation of coherent clonal growth occurs before gastrulation in the precursor tissue of the fetus in the mouse.  Development.  125,2397–2402.
Brook, F.A. and Gardner, R.L. (1997). The origin and efficient derivation of embryonic stem cells in the mouse. Proc. Nat. Acad. Sci. 94, 5709–5712.
Gardner, R. L. (2001) Specification of embryonic axes begins before cleavage in normal mouse development. Development 128, 839–847.
Gardner, R. L. (2007) The axis of polarity of the mouse blastocyst is specified before blastulation and independently of the zona pellucida. Hum. Reprod. 22, 798–806.
Gardner, R. L. (2010) Normal bias in the direction of fetal rotation depends on blastomere compositionduring early cleavage in the mouse. PLOS ONE 5, 1–5

Awards and honours
1977 – Zoological Society of London's Scientific Medal
1979 – Elected Fellow of The Royal Society
1999 – March of Dimes Prize in Developmental Biology
2001 – Royal Society's Royal Medal
2004 – Albert Brachet Prize of the Belgian Royal Academy of Sciences, Letters and Fine Arts
2005 – Knighthood for services to Biological Sciences
2012 – Honorary Doctorate of Science, University of Cambridge

References

External links
 Professor Sir Richard Gardner, University of York
 Professor Sir Richard Gardner, St Catherine's College, Cambridge
 '40 Years of IVF – The Biology' – 2009

1943 births
Living people
People from Dorking
People educated at St John's School, Leatherhead
Alumni of St Catharine's College, Cambridge
British geneticists
British embryologists
Academics of the University of York
Fellows of the Royal Society of Biology
Fellows of the Royal Society
Royal Medal winners
Knights Bachelor